John Drew-Bear (born 8 June 1955) is a Venezuelan Olympic Star class sailor. He participated in the 1984 Summer Olympics together with Christian Flebbe, where they finished 15th.

References

1955 births
Living people
Venezuelan male sailors (sport)
Star class sailors
Olympic sailors of Venezuela
Sailors at the 1984 Summer Olympics – Star
20th-century Venezuelan people
21st-century Venezuelan people